The University of Diyala is an Iraqi university located in Baquba, Diyala Governorate, Iraq. It was established in 1999.

Colleges of University of Diyala 
 Basic Education College
 College of Education For Human Science
 College of Education For Pure Science
 College of Physical Education
 College of Engineering
 College of Science
 College of Law and Political Science
 College of Medicine
 College of Veterinary
 College of Agriculture
 College of Economic
 College of Islamic
 College of Arts
 College of Education for Girls

Department of University of Diyala 
 Department of Scholarships and Cultural Relations
 Department of Research and Development
 Department of Center Childhood and Motherhood
 Department of Quality Assurance
 Department of Computer Center
 Department of Education and Planning
 Department of Center Printing
 Department of Information and Public Relations
 Department of Development and Continuing Education
 Department of Physical Education and Technical
 Department of Spatial Research
 ID Issue

External links 
 Official website 
 Official website 

Diyala
Educational institutions established in 1999
1999 establishments in Iraq